Wasted Youth Brew is a compilation album by American hardcore punk band Blood for Blood. It was released by Victory Records on April 24, 2001. The material comes from various compilation albums, demos and a live recording of the band.

Track listing
All tracks written by Blood for Blood, unless stated otherwise.
 "When the Storm Comes (I'll Stand Alone)" – 2:34 
 "Goin' Down the Bar" (Wretched Ones) – 3:05
 "No Friend of Mine" (Slapshot) – 2:40
 "All This and More" (Dead Boys) – 3:13
 "Intro"				– 1:23
 "Spit My Last Breath"			– 4:42
 "Can't Heal"				– 2:52
 "Piss All Over Your Hopes and Dreams"	– 2:33
 "Soulless"				– 4:40
 "Hurt You"				– 2:50
 "Chaos"				– 3:32
 "Paper Gangster"			– 2:17
 "The Strain"				– 2:59
 "Life"				– 2:37
 "Intro"				– 0:45
 "No Tomorrow"				– 1:50
 "Bitch Called Hope"			– 2:52
 "Cheap Wine"				– 2:34
 "Piss All Over Your Hopes and Dreams"	– 3:03
 "Maldito (Edit)"			– 0:51
 "Soulless"				– 5:21
 "Revenge on Society"			– 4:24
 "Eulogy For a Dream"			– 2:55
 "Nothing For You"			– 2:23
 "Paper Gangster"			– 4:06
 Tracks 1–2 from the split 7" with Hudson Falcons
 Track 3 from the Boston Drops the Gloves various artists tribute to Slapshot album
 Track 4 from the Punk Rock Jukebox Vol. 2 various artists compilation album
 Tracks 5–9 from the Kickboxing is Not a Crime various artists compilation album; tracks 7–9 also originally appeared on the Soulless 7"
 Tracks 10–13 from the 1995 demo Hurt You
 Track 14 from an unreleased 1994 demo
 Tracks 15–25 recorded live at the Middle East Club, Boston, Massachusetts on January 6, 2001

Credits
 Erick "Buddha" Medina – vocals
 "White Trash" Rob Lind – guitar
 Ian McFarland – bass, tracks 1–4 and 15–25
 Gina Benevides – bass, tracks 5–9
 Greg Dellaria – bass, tracks 10–13
 Jeremy Wooden – bass, track 14
 Mike Mahoney – drums, tracks 1–14
 Rowan Hildreth – drums, tracks 15–25

External links
Thorp Records band page

Blood for Blood albums
2001 compilation albums